Daniel Sunjata Condon (born December 30, 1971) is an American actor who performs in film, television and theater. He is known for his role as Franco Rivera in the FX television series Rescue Me.

Early life and education
Sunjata was born and raised in Evanston, Illinois, a suburb north of Chicago. He is the adopted son of Bill and Catherine Condon a police dispatcher and a civil rights worker. His adoptive parents are of Irish and Italian-German descent. He is named in honor of the Mandinka king Sundiata Keita, founder of the Mali Empire; the name means "hungry lion." He was told his biological mother was a white teenager who had run away from home and his father was African-American. He graduated from Mount Carmel High School in Chicago, where he played linebacker for two state championship football teams. After attending Florida A&M University, he earned a Bachelor of Arts degree from the University of Louisiana at Lafayette and a Master of Fine Arts from the Graduate Acting Program at New York University's Tisch School of the Arts. He is of African, German, and Irish descent.

Career
Sunjata played the role of a sailor on shore leave on the first post-9/11 themed episode of Sex and the City. He portrayed poet Langston Hughes in the film Brother to Brother (2004) and James Holt, a fashion designer, in The Devil Wears Prada (2006).

He starred as firefighter Franco Rivera on the television program Rescue Me. During the summer of 2007, he also starred in the ESPN miniseries The Bronx is Burning as Reggie Jackson. He appeared as a Special Forces Operative in Christopher Nolan's The Dark Knight Rises (2012).

In 2003, he won a Theatre World Award for his breakout Broadway performance as a gay Major League Baseball player who comes out to the public in Take Me Out, the Tony award-winning play, which also earned him nominations for a Tony Award and Drama Desk Award.

In 2010-2011 he played "Nurse Eli" on the TV series Grey's Anatomy and had a relationship with Dr. Miranda Bailey.

Beginning in 2013 he played FBI agent Paul Briggs on Graceland, which aired on USA Network. The show was canceled in 2015 after 3 seasons.

Views on the September 11 attacks

On April 30, 2009, Sunjata announced his participation as narrator in Loose Change 9/11: An American Coup. This was the last in a series of documentaries, collectively known as Loose Change, that argue that the September 11 attacks were planned by the United States government.

Sunjata has said that he believes "absolutely, 100 percent" in this theory. Producers of Rescue Me, inspired by Sunjata's views, created a subplot of the show that year (the show's fifth season) in which Sunjata's character, Franco Rivera, stirs up controversy in the firehouse when he tells these same views to a journalist.

Filmography

Film and TV Movies

Television

Video games

Theater

Awards and nominations

References

External links
 
 
 

1971 births
Living people
American male film actors
American male television actors
African-American male actors
Male actors from Chicago
Tisch School of the Arts alumni
Male actors from Evanston, Illinois
University of Louisiana at Lafayette alumni
American adoptees
American people of Irish descent
American people of German descent
9/11 conspiracy theorists
Theatre World Award winners